The Christine Jorgensen Story is a 1970 American drama film and a fictionalized biographical film about trans woman Christine Jorgensen. While the overall premise of the film is accurate, many of the details are fictionalized for the continuity of the film. It was directed by Irving Rapper and based on Christine Jorgensen's autobiography.

Plot

Cast
 John Hansen as George Jorgensen, Jr./Christine Jorgensen
 Trent Lehman as George at 7
 Joan Hopkins as Aunt Thora
 Quinn Redeker as Tom Crawford
 Pamelyn Ferdin as Dolly as a child
 Elaine Joyce as Loretta

Production
A film based on the book was proposed in 1960. Edward Small bought the film rights in 1968. Jorgensen later claimed under the contract she would be entitled to 10% of the gross and 3.5% of the budget.

"Every female impersonator in the world came flying into Hollywood demanding he was Christine", said Jorgensen later.
George/Christine is played by John Hansen.

Irving Rapper said Small gave him the job as director because it required someone who had sensitivity.

Release
Reviews were mixed.

Jorgensen later unsuccessfully tried to get a restraining order to stop Small's estate from exploiting the film, claiming Small diverted $100,000 owed to her for his own use. Jorgensen said she was worried United Artists would exploit the film as a B movie.

Home media
The Christine Jorgensen Story was released on DVD by MGM Home Entertainment on October 12, 2011, through its Ultimate Collection DVD-on-demand service.

See also
 List of American films of 1970
 Transgender in film and television

References

External links
 

1970 films
American LGBT-related films
1970s English-language films
Films directed by Irving Rapper
Films about trans women
United Artists films
1970 LGBT-related films
Films produced by Edward Small
Cultural depictions of Christine Jorgensen
Films scored by Paul Sawtell
Biographical films about LGBT people
1970s American films